Devil Bay is natural bay on the island of Newfoundland in the province of Newfoundland and Labrador, Canada. Its features include waterfalls and a steep bluff.  It is near Hare Bay and Rencontre Bay.

References

Bays of Newfoundland and Labrador